Dulfer is a surname. Notable people with the surname include:

Candy Dulfer (born 1969), Dutch jazz musician
Eric Dulfer (born 1961), Dutch cricketer
Hans Dulfer (born 1940), Dutch jazz musician
Kelly Dulfer (born 1994), Dutch handball player